Kirkstead Abbey is a former Cistercian monastery in Kirkstead, Lincolnshire, England.

The monastery was founded in 1139 by Hugh Brito, (or Hugh son of Eudo), lord of Tattershall, and was originally colonised by an abbot and twelve monks from Fountains Abbey in Yorkshire. The original site was not large enough however, and Robert, son of Hugh, found a better site a short distance away in 1187. The 1187 date is probably completion of the Abbey, as the architecture dates it to around 1175. The monks were granted the lordship of Wildmore by the lords of Bolingbroke, Scrivelsby and Horncastle, although they did retain the right of common pasture for themselves and their tenants.

The abbey remained in existence until 1537, when it was dissolved; the last abbot, Richard Harrison, and three of his monks were executed by Henry VIII following their implication (probably unjustly) in the Lincolnshire Rising of the previous year.

The land passed to the Duke of Suffolk and later to the Clinton Earls of Lincoln, who built a large country house. By 1791 that too had gone and all that remains today is a dramatic crag of masonry - a fragment of the south transept wall of the abbey church - and the earthworks of the vast complex of buildings that once surrounded it, which is Grade I listed, and an ancient scheduled monument.

Burials
John Beke, 1st Baron Beke

See also
 St. Leonard's Without (the 13th century chapel next to the abbey)
 Woodhall Spa

References

Cistercian monasteries in England
Monasteries in Lincolnshire
Religious organizations established in the 1130s
1537 disestablishments in England
Grade I listed buildings in Lincolnshire
Christian monasteries established in the 12th century
1139 establishments in England
Ruined abbeys and monasteries
Ruins in Lincolnshire